Acacia neurophylla, also known as wodjil, is a shrub or tree belonging to the genus Acacia and the subgenus Juliflorae that is endemic to south western Australia.

Description
It has an erect or low spreading habit with ribbed and glabrous branchlets. Like most species of Acacia it has phyllodes rather than true leaves. The evergreen and erect phylodes have a narrowly oblong-elliptic shape and are straight to shallowly incurved. The glabrous and rigid phyllodes have five to seven raised and equally prominent nerves.

Distribution
It is native to Wheatbelt, Mid West and Goldfields-Esperance regions of Western Australia and the plant will grow in sandy, loamy or lateritic soils and is often found on plains, rises and granite outcrops.

See also
List of Acacia species

References

neurophylla
Acacias of Western Australia
Plants described in 1904
Taxa named by William Vincent Fitzgerald